BSAP may refer to:

 B-cell-specific activator protein
 Baltic Sea Action Plan, Helsinki Committee
 Bone-specific alkaline phosphatase
 British Society of Animal Science, formerly British Society of Animal Production
 British South Africa Police
 Bristol Standard Asynchronous Protocol